|}

The Prix Six Perfections is a Group 3 flat horse race in France open to two-year-old thoroughbred fillies. It is run at Deauville over a distance of 1,400 metres (about 7 furlongs) each year in late July or early August.

History
The event is named after Six Perfections, a successful filly whose victories included Deauville's Prix Jacques Le Marois in 2003. It was established in 2010, and initially held Listed status.

The Prix Six Perfections was promoted to Group 3 level in 2018.

Records
Leading jockey (2 wins):
 Olivier Peslier – Elusive Kate (2011), Tigrilla (2014)
 Ioritz Mendizabal – Discernable (2012), Izzy Bizu (2017)
 Ryan Moore - Oscula (2021), Sydneyarms Chelsea (2022)

Leading trainer (2 wins):
 Mark Johnston – Discernable (2012), Izzy Bizu (2017)
 André Fabre - Tropbeau (2019), See The Rose (2020)

Leading owner:
 no owner has won this race more than once

Winners

See also
 List of French flat horse races

References

 Racing Post:

 galopp-sieger.de – Prix Six Perfections.
 horseracingintfed.com – International Federation of Horseracing Authorities – Prix Six Perfections (2018).
 pedigreequery.com – Prix Six Perfections – Deauville.
 thefrenchblacktype.com – Prix Six Perfections.

Flat horse races for two-year-old fillies
Deauville-La Touques Racecourse
Horse races in France
Recurring sporting events established in 2010